The 1952 Virginia Cavaliers football team represented the University of Virginia during the 1952 college football season. The Cavaliers were led by seventh-year head coach Art Guepe and played their home games at Scott Stadium in Charlottesville, Virginia. They finished with 8 wins for the third consecutive year, but were not invited to a bowl game. After the season, Guepe left Virginia to accept the head coaching position at Vanderbilt. He had a record of 47–17–2 at Virginia, and his winning percentage of .727 remains the highest among Virginia head coaches that coached more than one year.

Schedule

References

Virginia
Virginia Cavaliers football seasons
Virginia Cavaliers football